Adam Harrington may refer to:

 Adam Harrington (basketball) (born 1980), American basketball player
 Adam Harrington (voice actor) (born 1970), American voice actor
 Adam J. Harrington (born 1972), Canadian-American actor and producer